A tulip tree is a member of the genus Liriodendron in family Magnoliaceae.

Tulip tree may also refer to:
 Markhamia lutea or Nile tulip tree, in family Bignoniaceae
Spathodea or African tulip tree, a genus in family Bignoniaceae